The Occoquan Bay National Wildlife Refuge is a National Wildlife Refuge located where the Occoquan River meets the Potomac River in Woodbridge, Virginia, United States between Belmont Bay and Occoquan Bay.  The  site, about half of which is wetlands, was a popular tourist spot known as Dawson Beach until the 1940s, after which it was used for military research by the U.S. Army's Harry Diamond Laboratories from the 1960s to the 1990s. When the land was purchased from the military, it was temporarily called the Marumsco National Wildlife Refuge. The refuge was formally established and renamed in 1998, and is now managed by the United States Fish and Wildlife Service as part of the Potomac River National Wildlife Refuge Complex.

Geography and biodiversity 

When the Army obtained the site in 1950 for use as a radio transmitting station, fields of antennas replaced cows and crops. In the 1970s, the base's mission shifted to top secret research. Electromagnetic pulse testing and sight lines for security kept the vegetation low, primarily in grasslands. When the base closed in the 1990s, the U.S. Fish and Wildlife Service was able to continue to preserve these grasslands as wildlife habitat.

The refuge has a mix of wetlands, forest, and native grasslands that provides a diversity of habitats for wide variety of species. Wetland habitats cover about 50% of the refuge and include wet meadows, bottomland hardwoods, open freshwater marsh, and tidally influenced marshes and streams. Upland meadows and mature oak-hickory-beech forest are interspersed among the wetlands. The unusual number and interspersion of habitats provides visitors an opportunity to view a wide variety of wildlife species and habitats in a relatively small area. Noted for its grassland nesting birds, neo-tropical migrants and raptors, the refuge also hosts wildlife common to Virginia. Over 220 species of birds, over 600 species of plants, and 65 species of butterflies have been documented on the refuge. Many of the bird species are uncommon or rare in the region.

Visiting 
Approximately  of old patrol roads are reserved for foot traffic, rotating between three  loops. Information is posted at the visitor contact station and at trail heads. Wildlife Drive also contains  of old patrol roads reserved for motor vehicle and bicycle access. Vehicles can serve as a mobile blind, allowing visitors closer views; the blind effect is also why drivers and passengers must stay in their vehicles while on the drive.

References

External links
Occoquan Bay National Wildlife Refuge

National Wildlife Refuges in Virginia
Protected areas of Prince William County, Virginia
Protected areas established in 1998
1998 establishments in Virginia
Wetlands of Virginia
Landforms of Prince William County, Virginia
Woodbridge, Virginia